Mikhaylovka is a rural locality (a village) in Yanurusovsky Selsoviet, Ishimbaysky District, Bashkortostan, Russia. The population was 26 as of 2010.

Geography 
It is located 42 km from Ishimbay and 4 km from Yanurusovo.

References 

Rural localities in Ishimbaysky District